Rubén Cabral (20 March 1919 – 25 September 2008) was an Argentine rower. He competed in the men's eight event at the 1948 Summer Olympics.

References

1919 births
2008 deaths
Argentine male rowers
Olympic rowers of Argentina
Rowers at the 1948 Summer Olympics
Sportspeople from Rosario, Santa Fe